The 2021 Paris–Roubaix Femmes was a French road cycling one-day race that took place on 2 October 2021. It was the first edition of Paris–Roubaix Femmes and the 16th event of the 2021 UCI Women's World Tour. The race was won by Lizzie Deignan of Great Britain, after a solo break with more than two thirds of the course remaining, a victory described by commentators as one of the greatest Roubaix rides of all time.

Route 
The first women's edition of Paris–Roubaix Femmes started in Denain and finished on the velodrome in Roubaix covering . It featured  of cobblestones, spread out over 17 sectors. The women covered the same final 17 sectors as the men's race.

Summary 
The Paris–Roubaix weekend was wet and rainy, for the first time for nearly 20 years. The race was held in October, having been postponed from its original April date due to a French COVID-19 lockdown. 

The much delayed, and much anticipated, first edition of the women's version of the 'Queen of the Classics' was won by Great Britain's Lizzie Deignan racing for Trek–Segafredo. Attacking on her own at the first pavé section at Hornaing, Deignan went clear across the first cobbled section, and then soloed for the last 80 kilometres of the race as the peloton splintered behind her, building a lead of 2:40 across all 17 pavé sections, before entering the Roubaix Velodrome alone, over a minute in front of Marianne Vos. Elisa Longo Borghini held off a fast closing Lisa Brennauer for third place, and completed the first podium of Paris-Roubaix-Femmes. Deignan's attack and solo victory was described by commentators as one of the greatest Roubaix rides of all time.

Cobbled sections

Teams 
All nine UCI Women's WorldTeams and 13 UCI Women's Continental Teams made up the 22 teams that participated in the race. Of the 129 riders to start the race, 61 riders finished while a further 44 riders finished outside of the time limit (8 percent after the winning time, or + 14' 05").

UCI Women's WorldTeams

 
 
 
 
 
 
 
 
 

UCI Women's Continental Teams

Result

References

External links 
 

Paris-Roubaix (women's race)
Paris-Roubaix (women's race)
Paris-Roubaix (women's race)
Paris-Roubaix (women's race)
Paris–Roubaix